William D. Wulff (born 1949) is an American chemist, currently at Michigan State University and an Elected Fellow of the American Association for the Advancement of Science.

References

Fellows of the American Association for the Advancement of Science
21st-century American chemists
1949 births
Living people
University of Wisconsin–Eau Claire alumni
Iowa State University alumni